Thomas Rymer (c. 1643 – 14 December 1713) was an English poet, critic, antiquary and historian. His lasting contribution was to compile and publish 16 volumes of the first edition of Foedera, a work in 20 volumes conveying agreements between The Crown of England and foreign powers since 1101. He held the office of English Historiographer Royal from 1692 to 1714. He is credited with coining the phrase "poetic justice" in The Tragedies of the Last Age Consider'd (1678).

Early life and education

Thomas Rymer was born at Appleton Wiske, near Northallerton in the North Riding of Yorkshire in 1643, or possibly at Yafforth. He was the younger son of Ralph Rymer, lord of the manor of Brafferton in Yorkshire, said by Clarendon to possess a good estate. The son studied at Northallerton Grammar School, where he was a classmate of George Hickes. There he studied for eight years under Thomas Smelt, a noted Royalist. Aged 16, he went to study at Sidney Sussex College, Cambridge, matriculating on 29 April 1659.

Although Rymer was still at Cambridge in 1662 when he contributed Latin verses to a university volume to mark the marriage of Charles II and Catherine of Braganza, there is no record of his taking a degree. This may have been due to financial problems his father was suffering at the time, or to his father's arrest on 13 October 1663 — he was executed the following year for involvement in the Farnley Wood Plot, an intended uprising in Yorkshire against Charles II. Although Thomas's elder brother Ralph was also arrested and imprisoned, Thomas was not implicated. On 2 May 1666 he became a member of Gray's Inn. He was called to the bar on 16 June 1673.

Career
Rymer's first appearance in print, was as translator of René Rapin's Reflections on Aristotle's Treatise of Poesie (1674), to which he added a preface in defence of the classic rules for unity in drama. Following the principles set there, he composed a verse tragedy licensed on 13 September 1677, called Edgar, or the English Monarch, which failed. It was printed in 1678, with a second edition in 1693. Rymer's views on drama were again given to the world in a printed letter to Fleetwood Shepheard, a friend of Matthew Prior, entitled The Tragedies of the Last Age Consider'd (1678). Here, in discussing Rollo Duke of Normandy by John Fletcher, Philip Massinger, Ben Jonson, and George Chapman, Rymer coined the term "poetical justice".

To Ovid's Epistles Translated by Several Hands (1680), prefaced by Dryden, Rymer contributed Penelope to Ulysses. He was also one of those who Englished the so-called Dryden's Plutarch of 1683–1686 (5 vols.): the life of Nicias fell to his share. Rymer wrote a preface to Whitelocke's Memorials of English Affairs (1682), and in 1681 A General Draught and Prospect of the Government of Europe, reprinted in 1689 and 1714 as Of the Antiquity, Power, and Decay of Parliaments, where ignorant of a future dignity that would be his, he had the misfortune to observe, "You are not to expect truth from an historiographer royal."

Rymer contributed three pieces to the collection of Poems to the Memory of Edmund Waller (1688) (afterwards reprinted in Dryden's Miscellany Poems), and wrote the Latin inscription on all four sides of Edmund Waller's monument in Beaconsfield churchyard.

The preface ("Lectori salutem") to the posthumous Historia Ecclesiastica (1688) of Thomas Hobbes seems to have been written by Rymer. An English translation appeared in 1722. The Life of Hobbes (1681), sometimes ascribed to him, was written by Richard Blackburne. He produced a congratulatory poem on the arrival of Queen Mary in Westminster with William III on 12 February 1689.

Rymer's next piece of authorship was to translate the sixth elegy of the third book of Ovid's Tristia for Dryden's Poetical Miscellanies. The only version to contain Rymer's rendering seems to be the second edition of the second part of the Miscellanies, subtitled Silvae (1692).

On the death of Thomas Shadwell in 1692, Rymer was appointed historiographer royal at a yearly salary of £200. Immediately after, there appeared his much-discussed A Short View of Tragedy (1693), criticising Shakespeare and Ben Jonson, which gave rise to The Impartial Critick (1693) of John Dennis, the epigram of Dryden.

Foedera
Rymer's lasting contribution to scholarship was the Foedera, a collection of "all the leagues, treaties, alliances, capitulations, and confederacies, which have at any time been made between the Crown of England and any other kingdoms, princes and states." Documents were presented in Latin with summaries in English. Begun under a royal warrant in 1693, it was "an immense labour of research and transcription on which he spent the last twenty years of his life".

The first edition of the Foedera consisted of 20 volumes dated 1704–1735. Sixteen were prepared by Rymer, of which the last two were published posthumously by his assistant Robert Sanderson, who himself compiled the remaining volumes, the last three being supplementary.

George Holmes revised the first 17 volumes, published from 1727 to 1735, and a single folio in 1730 of corrections to the first edition.

The "Hague edition" was published from 1737 to 1745 in "ten closely-printed folio volumes". The first nine reprinted the London edition, with the tenth combining Paul de Rapin's French-language synopsis and an index to the Foedera. Rapin's text had been translated into English in 1733.

The Record Commission in 1800 proposed a "Supplement and Continuation" to the Foedera; in 1809 it decided instead to make a complete revision. Seven parts were prepared before the project was abandoned due to dissatisfaction with the editing by Dr Adam Clarke and others. Six parts in three volumes were published from 1816 to 1830 and the seventh in 1869, along with miscellaneous notes. The work was thus revised up to the year 1383. A three-volume English-language summary and index of the complete Foedera by Sir Thomas Duffus Hardy followed. The Victoria County History recommends citing the Record Commission (RC) edition where available and the Hague edition otherwise.

Death
Rymer died on 14 December 1713 and was buried four days later in St Clement Danes' Church in the  Strand in London. He appears not to have left any immediate family.

References
Notes

Citations

Attribution:

Bibliography

Further reading

External links

1640s births
1713 deaths
People from Northallerton
Alumni of Sidney Sussex College, Cambridge
Members of Gray's Inn
17th-century English historians
18th-century English historians